Stateless is the debut studio album by English-American singer Lene Lovich. It was released in October 1978 by Stiff Records and produced by Lene Lovich and Les Chappell (credited as "The Stateless").

Release

The album was first released outside the United Kingdom, then following the success of the lead single "Lucky Number". The UK version of the album was released with a slightly different track list. In the United States, the album was released in 1979.

The album was available in two very different variations. The more common release had most of the songs remixed from the original versions and now included the single version of "Lucky Number". Some songs were slightly shortened and many had new vocals accentuating Lovich's quirky singing style. The original vocals were often more straightforward. The running order was shuffled and the album cover also varied between countries.

Stateless peaked at number 35 on the UK Albums Chart, while also managing to chart in Australia, the Netherlands and New Zealand. "Lucky Number" peaked at number three on the UK Singles Chart.

Reception

Upon its release, Stateless received positive reviews from music critics. The Village Voices Robert Christgau called Lovich "an original" and found that her "goofy energy doesn't distract her from her feelings or damage her sex appeal or conceal a mawkish underside."

Track listings

Personnel
 Lene Lovich – vocals, saxophone
 Les Chappell – guitar, EMS synthesizer, percussion, vocals
 Jeff Smith – synthesizer
 Nick Plytas – Hammond organ, piano
 Ron François – bass, percussion, vocals
 Bobby Irwin – drums, percussion, vocals
 Don Snow – piano on "Too Tender (To Touch)"
Technical
Aldo Bocca, Jeremy Green, Pete Fox, Roger Bechirian - engineer
 Brian Griffin – photography

Charts

References

External links
 [ Stateless] at AllMusic
 

Lene Lovich albums
1978 debut albums
Stiff Records albums
Albums produced by Roger Bechirian